Belemia is a genus of flowering plants belonging to the family Nyctaginaceae.

Its native range is Northern Brazil.

Species:

Belemia fucsioides

References

Nyctaginaceae
Caryophyllales genera